Arne Strömberg (20 June 1920, in Karlskrona, Sweden – 25 January 1988) was a Swedish ice hockey coach. He coached the Sweden national men's ice hockey team  and several Swedish hockey clubs during his career.

He resigned after the 1971 World Championship, following Sweden's defeat, 1-2, against West Germany. He was replaced with Billy Harris.

References

1920 births
1988 deaths
IIHF Hall of Fame inductees
Sweden men's national ice hockey team coaches
Swedish ice hockey coaches
People from Karlskrona
Sportspeople from Blekinge County